Ane Sofie Tømmerås (born 18 February 1966, in Halden) is a Norwegian politician for the Labour Party.

She was elected to the Norwegian Parliament from Østfold in 1993, and was re-elected on one occasion. She later served in the position of deputy representative during the term 2001–2005.

References

1966 births
Living people
Labour Party (Norway) politicians
Members of the Storting
Women members of the Storting
21st-century Norwegian politicians
21st-century Norwegian women politicians
20th-century Norwegian politicians
20th-century Norwegian women politicians
People from Halden